Fake Noise from a Box of Toys is the fourth and final studio album by American alternative rock band The Autumns, released in 2007.

Track listing
All songs written by the Autumns.

"Turning Strangers Into Friends And Friends Into Customers"
"Boys"
"Clem"
"The Midnight Knock"
"Killer in Drag"
"Night Music"
"Only Young"
"Glass Jaw"
"Uncle Slim"
"Beautiful Boot"
"Adelaide"
"Oh My Heart"

References

2007 albums
The Autumns albums
Bella Union albums